Martin Wiig (born 22 August 1983) is a retired Norwegian football striker.

Career
Wiig was born in Bodø and spent his youth years in Bodø/Glimt and Urædd, and made his debut in Tippeligaen in 2001 for Odd Grenland, scoring 3 goals in 9 games. He was a first-team regular in 2002 and 2003, but lost his place in 2004 and was loaned out briefly to Sandefjord. in 2005 he joined Fredrikstad, but after a decent debut season there he again lost his place. He joined Sparta Sarpsborg on loan in 2006, a move which was made permanent in 2007, and later continued his career in Sarpsborg 08 after the merge.

In 2012, he became top goalscorer (20) in Adeccoligaen with Sarpsborg 08, and the club advanced yet again to  Tippeligaen.

In December 2015 he signed a contract with Bodø/Glimt. In the summer of 2016 he finished his career in KFUM Oslo in the Norwegian First Division.

Career statistics

Honours
Individual
 Adeccoligaen top scorer: 2012

References

External links
100% Fotball player statistics 

1983 births
Living people
Sportspeople from Bodø
Norwegian footballers
FK Bodø/Glimt players
Odds BK players
Sandefjord Fotball players
Fredrikstad FK players
Sarpsborg 08 FF players
KFUM-Kameratene Oslo players
Eliteserien players
Norwegian First Division players

Association football forwards